Vaskuti or Vaskúti is a Hungarian surname. Notable people with the surname include:

 István Vaskuti (born 1955), Hungarian sprint canoeist
 László Vaskúti, Hungarian sprint canoeist

Hungarian-language surnames